The borders of Sweden are as follows:
 The Sweden-Denmark border
 The Sweden-Finland border 
 The Sweden-Norway border